The 32nd Golden Rooster Awards honoring best Chinese language films which presented during 2018–19. The award ceremony was held in Xiamen, China, and broadcast by CCTV.

Schedule

Winners and nominees

References

External links

2018-19
Golden Rooster
Golden Rooster